Tokio is a rural location and former rural community in Adams County, in the Palouse region of eastern Washington. It is located along Interstate 90 northeast of Ritzville.Japanese Vignettes, p. 16 (1939) ("There is a Tokio in the northeastern corner of Adams County in eastern Washington")

History
In 1888, Northern Pacific Railway railway officials named the railroad stop at this location "Iona."  It was changed to Tracy in 1905, and then Tokio in 1906.

In the early 20th century the community had a rural school; its enrollment in 1917-18 was 10 pupils.  Essentially the small community of that period has since dissipated.

Several wheat fields in Tokio and neighboring areas were destroyed by a  fire on July 31, 1998, which killed one farmer. His wheat crop was harvested by neighbors in a community celebration of life.

The freeway exit is adjacent to a weigh station, which inspired the name of a Spokane band. The weigh station has a truck stop and restaurant, along with a recreational cannabis store that opened in 2016. The truck stop was also used as a filming location for The Promise, an independent movie released in 2004.

References

Ghost towns in Washington (state)
Geography of Adams County, Washington